Anne Cibis (née Möllinger; born 27 September 1985 in Worms) is a track and field sprint athlete who competes internationally for Germany.

Cibis represented Germany at the 2008 Summer Olympics in Beijing. She competed at the 4 × 100 metres relay together with Verena Sailer, Cathleen Tschirch and Marion Wagner. In their first round heat they placed third behind Jamaica and Russia and in front of China. Their time of 43.59 seconds was the eighth time overall out of sixteen participating nations. With this result they qualified for the final in which they sprinted to a time of 43.28 seconds for fifth place.

She again appeared in the German 4 × 100 m team at the 2012 Summer Olympics.  She and teammates Leena Günther, Tatjana Pinto and Verena Sailer reached the final and again finished fifth, with a time of 42.67.

References

External links 

 
 
 
 
 

1985 births
Living people
People from Worms, Germany
German female sprinters
Olympic athletes of Germany
Athletes (track and field) at the 2008 Summer Olympics
Athletes (track and field) at the 2012 Summer Olympics
Sportspeople from Rhineland-Palatinate
World Athletics Championships medalists
European Athletics Championships medalists
Olympic female sprinters